This is a list of Muslim astronauts who have traveled to space. As of August 4, 2022, 10 Muslims (10 men) have been in space, all of whom remain alive.

List of Muslim astronauts

Praying towards Mecca in space

Malaysia's space agency, Angkasa, convened a conference of 150 Islamic scientists and scholars in 2006 to address the question, among others, of how to pray towards Mecca in space.  A document was produced in early 2007 called A Guideline of Performing Ibadah (worship) at the International Space Station (ISS) and was approved by Malaysia's National Fatwa Council.

See also
 Angkasawan program
 List of Arab astronauts

References

Muslim astronauts
Lists of Muslims